Atticus Capital was a Wall Street hedge fund. It was founded by Nathaniel Rothschild and Timothy Barakett in 1995.

History
Atticus helped to stop the Deutsche Börse from taking over the London Stock Exchange.

Atticus was instrumental in the merger of Arcelor with Mittal Steel.

Atticus, from a minority shareholder position, successfully prevented Phelps Dodge from merging with INCO Ltd in 2006 because it insisted on a share buy-back scheme rather than the merger investment.

In 2006, Atticus was rumoured to have $10 billion under administration.

Before it was wound down in 2010, Atticus was rumoured to have $20 billion under administration.

Leadership
Timothy Barakett was CEO of Atticus for the first 15 years of its life.

References

Hedge funds
Defunct hedge funds
Hedge fund firms in New York City
Hedge fund firms of the United States
1995 establishments in New York (state)
2010 disestablishments in New York (state)